The 1941 PGA Championship was the 24th PGA Championship, held July 7–13 at Cherry Hills Country Club in Englewood, Colorado (now Cherry Hills Village), just south of Denver.  Then a match play championship, Vic Ghezzi won his only major title over defending champion Byron Nelson in 38 holes. Nelson defeated Ralph Guldahl, Ben Hogan, and Gene Sarazen on successive days to reach his third consecutive final.

Seven of the eight quarterfinalists in 1941 won major titles during their careers.  Sam Snead was the medalist in the stroke play qualifier at 138 (−4); he lost in the quarterfinals but won the first of his three titles the following year.

Due to World War II, this was the last "full field" at the PGA Championship until 1946. The match play bracket was scaled back from 64 competitors to 32 for 1942, when it and the Masters were the only majors held. The PGA Championship was the only major in 1944 and 1945; none were played in 1943 and the other three returned in 1946.

This was the last time the final match in the PGA Championship went to extra holes.  The PGA Championship changed to stroke play in 1958 and its first two playoffs in 1961 and 1967 were 18 holes, before conversion to sudden-death, first used in 1977 and last in 1996. The present three-hole aggregate playoff made its debut in 2000.

This championship was the second major played at this course; the U.S. Open was held at Cherry Hills three years earlier in 1938, won by Guldahl. It later hosted the U.S. Open in 1960 and 1978, and the PGA Championship in 1985.

Format
The match play format at the PGA Championship in 1941 called for 12 rounds (216 holes) in seven days:
 Monday and Tuesday – 36-hole stroke play qualifier, 18 holes per day;
defending champion Byron Nelson and top 63 professionals advanced to match play
 Wednesday – first two rounds, 18 holes each
 Thursday – third round – 36 holes
 Friday – quarterfinals – 36 holes
 Saturday – semifinals – 36 holes
 Sunday – final – 36 holes

Past champions in the field

Failed to qualify

Source:

Final results
Sunday, July 13, 1941

Source:

Final eight bracket

Final match scorecards
Morning

Afternoon

Extra holes

Source:

References

External links
PGA Media Guide 2012
PGA.com – 1941 PGA Championship

PGA Championship
Golf in Colorado
Sports competitions in Denver
Englewood, Colorado
PGA Championship
PGA Championship
PGA Championship
PGA Championship
1940s in Denver